Zhenjiang High School of Jiangsu Province, colloquially known in Chinese as Zhèn Zhōng, was established in 1892 in the city of Zhenjiang, Jiangsu Province, China. It is regarded as one of the best and the most selective Middle Schools in Zhenjiang. Zhenjiang High School of Jiangsu Province is the first national middle school in Zhenjiang.

References

High schools in Jiangsu
Educational institutions established in 1892
1892 establishments in China
Zhenjiang
Junior secondary schools in China